La Moine River is a  tributary of the Illinois River in western Illinois in the United States. It is part of the watershed of the Mississippi River.

Course
La Moine River rises in southwestern Warren County and initially flows southwestwardly through southeastern Henderson and northwestern McDonough counties into Hancock County, where it turns to the southeast and flows through McDonough and Schuyler counties. In its lower course the river passes the village of Ripley and is used to define a portion of the boundary between Schuyler and Brown counties.

In its headwaters region the river collects the short South Branch La Moine River, which rises in McDonough County and flows west-southwestwardly into Hancock County, past La Harpe.  In Hancock County it collects the East Fork La Moine River, which rises in Warren County and flows south- and southwestwardly through McDonough County, past Macomb.

Variant names
The United States Board on Geographic Names settled on "La Moine River" as the river's official name in 1933.  According to the Geographic Names Information System, the river has also been known as:
Crooked Creek
Lamoine River
Lamoine Creek
Rivière à la Moine or Rivière au Moine (Monk river)
Rivière à la Mine  (Mine river)

Conservation
La Moine River Ecosystem Partnership A collaboration of more than 25 public and private organizations, landowners, and residents dedicated to the protection, restoration, and stewardship of the natural resources of the La Moine River watershed and adjacent areas.

See also
List of Illinois rivers

Sources
Columbia Gazetteer of North America entry
DeLorme (2003).  Illinois Atlas & Gazetteer.  Yarmouth, Maine: DeLorme.  .

References

External links
La Moine River Ecosystem Partnership

Rivers of Illinois
Rivers of Brown County, Illinois
Rivers of Hancock County, Illinois
Rivers of Henderson County, Illinois
Rivers of McDonough County, Illinois
Rivers of Schuyler County, Illinois
Rivers of Warren County, Illinois
Tributaries of the Illinois River